Birohi is a Bengali-language streaming television series directed by Pradipta Bhattacharyya, the National award-winning director of Bakita Byaktigato released on the Uribaba OTT platform, first independent free content station of West Bengal. This is the debut streaming series of director Bhattacharya and producer Ritwick Chakraborty. Media compared Birohi with the popular Hindi streaming series Panchayat. Season 2 of Birohi was released in December 2022.

Plot
The story revolves with the life of a timid unemployed person Krishnakanta Haldar. He gets a job as a primary school teacher in a remote village Birohi. It presents a hurdles crossing journey of a teacher who faces the real features of rural Bengal, politics, love and compassion.

Cast
 Sayan Ghosh as Krishnakanta
 Satakshi Nandy as Radha
 Amit Saha as Tyapa Mondal
 Srabanti Bhattacharya as Jamidar
 Dipak Halder as Bom Bolai
 Anuradha Mukherjee as Kalpana
 Soham Maitra as Arun
 Nilay Samiran Nandi as Pokai
 Sk Sahebul Haque as Ranjit

Season 1 (2021) 
The first season of the series started streaming from 10 September 2021 with six episodes.

Episodes

References

External links
 

Indian web series
Bengali-language web series
2021 web series debuts